Muricopsis (Muricopsis) omanensis is a species of sea snail, a marine gastropod mollusk in the family Muricidae, the murex snails or rock snails.

Description

Distribution
This marine species occurs off Oman.

References

A new species of Muricopsis from Oman (Prosobranchia: Muricacea). Journal of Conchology 32: 181–183

Muricidae
Gastropods described in 1986